Springvale is an outer southern suburb of Wagga Wagga, New South Wales, Australia. Springvale is located to the south of Bourkelands, and to the West of Lake Albert on the Holbrook Road.

References

External links 

Suburbs of Wagga Wagga